The 1992 Nicholls State Colonels football team represented Nicholls State University as a member of the Southland Conference during the 1992 NCAA Division I-AA football season. Led by Phil Greco in his sixth and final season as head coach, the Colonels compiled an overall record of 1–9–1 with mark of 0–6–1 in conference play, placing last out of eight teams in the Southland. Nicholls State played home games at John L. Guidry Stadium in Thibodaux, Louisiana.

Schedule

References

Nicholls State
Nicholls Colonels football seasons
Nicholls State Colonels football